Acme is an unincorporated community in Hamilton Township, Jackson County, Indiana.

History
A post office was established in Acme in 1884, and remained in operation until it was discontinued in 1891. Acme is likely derived from a Greek word meaning "best".

Geography

References

Unincorporated communities in Jackson County, Indiana
Unincorporated communities in Indiana